Nigel Boogaard (born 14 August 1986) is a former Australian professional footballer who played as a central defender in the A-League. Boogaard currently plays for Charlestown Azzurri in the Northern NSW Football National Premier Leagues competition.

Club career

Central Coast Mariners
Coming from the Weston Workers Bears, Boogaard has had a rollercoaster career. He scored his first A-League goal for the Mariners in a match against bitter rivals Newcastle Jets on 14 August 2009 (also his 23rd birthday). It was a miscued header off the shoulder after poor defending and the keeper dropped it over the line.

Adelaide United
Boogaard signed with Adelaide United on 6 November 2009 and joined them for their upcoming AFC Champions League campaign.

On 8 May 2012, it was announced that Boogaard had signed for a further two years with Adelaide United.

On 20 July 2013, Boogaard started for the A-League All Stars in the inaugural A-League All Stars Game against Manchester United, a match in which the A-League All Stars were thrashed 5-1, courtesy of goals from Danny Welbeck, Jesse Lingard and Robin van Persie. Boogaard, along with Brisbane Roar forward Besart Berisha, were the only players to play out the full match.

Newcastle Jets
Boogaard signed a three-year deal with his hometown club, the Newcastle Jets, on 16 February 2015.

Retirement 
On the 11th of June, 2021, Boogaard announced that he would retire, ending his sixteen-year playing career. As of this date, Boogaard is currently completing "his coaching badges", stating his plans to "give back to the game in some way".

Charlestown Azzurri 
Nigel joined Charlestown Azzurri FC for the 2022 National Premier Leagues Northern NSW season, alongside another former A-League Men's player in Jacob Melling. Fellow former Newcastle Jets player, Taylor Regan, joined Nigel halfway through the season.

Career statistics

1Includes FFA Cup, A-League Pre-Season Challenge Cup

Honours

Club

Adelaide United
 FFA Cup: 2014

International
Australia national football team
OFC U-17 Championship: 2003

Individual
 A-League All Stars: 2013

References

External links
 Adelaide United profile
 FFA – Olyroo profile
 Oz Football profile

1986 births
Living people
Soccer players from Sydney
Australian people of Dutch descent
Australia youth international soccer players
A-League Men players
National Soccer League (Australia) players
Central Coast Mariners FC players
Adelaide United FC players
Newcastle Jets FC players
Association football defenders
Australian soccer players
Newcastle Breakers FC players